"Por una Cabeza" is a tango song written in 1935 with music by Carlos Gardel and lyrics by Alfredo Le Pera.

Composition and lyrics
The name is a Spanish horse-racing phrase meaning "by a head", which refers to a horse winning a race narrowly by just the length of its head. The lyrics speak of a compulsive horse-track gambler who compares his addiction for horses with his attraction to women.

Alfredo Le Pera was born in Brazil, son of Italian immigrants. Le Pera and Gardel died in an aeroplane crash in Medellín, on Monday, June 24, 1935.

Notable uses
"Por Una Cabeza" is featured in a famous tango scene in Martin Brest's film Scent of a Woman (1992), in the opening scene of Steven Spielberg's Schindler's List (1993) and in James Cameron's True Lies (1994).

Lyrics

Por una cabeza
de un noble potrillo
que justo en la raya
afloja al llegar,
y que al regresar
parece decir:
No olvidés, hermano,
vos sabés, no hay que jugar.
Por una cabeza,
metejón de un día
de aquella coqueta
y risueña mujer,
que al jurar sonriendo
el amor que está mintiendo,
quema en una hoguera
todo mi querer.

Por una cabeza,
todas las locuras.
Su boca que besa,
borra la tristeza,
calma la amargura.
Por una cabeza,
si ella me olvida
qué importa perderme
mil veces la vida,
para qué vivir.

Cuántos desengaños,
por una cabeza.
Yo juré mil veces,
no vuelvo a insistir.
Pero si un mirar
me hiere al pasar,
su boca de fuego
otra vez quiero besar.
Basta de carreras,
se acabó la timba.
¡Un final reñido
yo no vuelvo a ver!
Pero si algún pingo
llega a ser fija el domingo,
yo me juego entero.
¡Qué le voy a hacer..!

Por una cabeza,
todas las locuras.
Su boca que besa,
borra la tristeza,
calma la amargura.
Por una cabeza,
si ella me olvida
qué importa perderme
mil veces la vida,
para qué vivir.

See also 
 Music of Argentina
 Music of Uruguay
 Public domain music

References

External links

Por una Cabeza's Lyrics, music, scores, versions
English translation

Arranged and performed by Augustin Hadelich for violin on YouTube

1935 songs
Spanish-language songs
Tangos
Songs with lyrics by Alfredo Le Pera
Songs with music by Carlos Gardel